killall is a command line utility available on Unix-like systems. There are two very different implementations.

 The implementation supplied with genuine UNIX System V (including Solaris) and with the Linux sysvinit tools kills all processes that the user is able to kill, potentially shutting down the system if run by root.
 The implementation supplied with the FreeBSD (including Mac OS X) and Linux psmisc tools is similar to the pkill and skill commands, killing only the processes specified on the command line.

Both commands operate by sending a signal, like the kill program.

Example usage
Kill all processes named xmms:
killall xmms

See also

 List of Unix commands
 Signal (computing)

External links
 
 
 
 

Unix process- and task-management-related software

de:Kill (Unix)#killall